Illiosentidae is a family of parasitic worms from the order Echinorhynchida.

Species
Illiosentidae contains the following species:

Brentisentis Leotta, Schmidt & Kuntz, 1982
Brentisentis chongqingensis Wei, 1998

The species name chongqingensis was named after the location where the samples were collected: Chongqing, China.

Brentisentis uncinus Leotta, Schmidt, Kuntz, 1982

B. uncinus was found infesting the small intestines of the Tank goby (Glossogobius giuris) and Eleotris pisonis near the mouth of Keelung River, Taiwan.

Brentisentis yangtzensis Yu and Wu, 1989
Dentitruncus Sinzar, 1955
Dentitruncus truttae Sinzar, 1955
Dollfusentis Golvan, 1969
Dollfusentis bravoae Salgado-Maldonado, 1976
Dollfusentis chandleri Golvan, 1969
Dollfusentis ctenorhynchus (Cable & Linderoth, 1963) Golvan, 1969
Dollfusentis heteracanthus (Cable and Linderoth, 1963)
Dollfusentis longispinus (Cable & Linderoth, 1963) Golvan, 1969
Dollfusentis salgadoi Monks, Aleman-Garcia & Pulido-Flores, 2008

Goacanthus Gupta & Jain, 1980
Goacanthus panajiensis Gupta and Jain, 1980
Indorhynchus Golvan, 1969
Indorhynchus indicus (Tripathi, 1959) Golvan, 1969
Indorhynchus pseudobargi Wang and Wang, 1988
Koronacantha Monks & Ponce de Leon, 1996
Koronacantha mexicana Monks & Ponce de Leon, 1996
Koronacantha pectinaria (Van Cleave, 1940) Monks & Pérez-Ponce de León, 1996
Metarhadinorhynchus Yamaguti, 1959
Metarhadinorhynchus cyprini Yin, 1961
Metarhadinorhynchus echeneisi Gupta & Sinha, 1991
Metarhadinorhynchus laterolabracis Yamaguti, 1959

M. laterolabracis is the type species.
	 
Metarhadinorhynchus thapari Gupta & Gupta, 1975
Metarhadinorhynchus valiyathurae Nadakal, John et Jacob, 1990
Paradentitruncus Moravec & Sey, 1989
Paradentitruncus longireceptaculis Moravec & Sey, 1989
Pseudorhadinorhynchus Achmerow & Dombrowskaja-Achmerova, 1941
Pseudorhadinorhynchus cinereus Gupta & Nagui, 1983

P. cinereus was found infesting Stromateus cinereus in Pakistan.

Pseudorhadinorhynchus cochinensis Gupta & Nagui, 1983
Pseudorhadinorhynchus deeghai Saxena, 2003
Pseudorhadinorhynchus dhari Kumar, 1992
Pseudorhadinorhynchus dussamicitatum Gupta & Gupta, 1972 
Pseudorhadinorhynchus ernakulensis Gupta & Gupta, 1972
Pseudorhadinorhynchus guptai Gupta & Sinha, 1993
Pseudorhadinorhynchus leuciscus (Krotov & Petrochenko, 1956)
Pseudorhadinorhynchus longicollum Gupta & Naqvi, 1986
Pseudorhadinorhynchus machidai Kumar, 1992
Pseudorhadinorhynchus markewitschi Achmerov and Dombrovskaja-Achmerova, 1941
Pseudorhadinorhynchus mujibi Gupta & Nagui, 1983

P. mujibi was found infesting Stromateus sinensis in Pakistan.

Pseudorhadinorhynchus nandai Gupta and Sinha, 1993
Pseudorhadinorhynchus orissai Gupta & Fatma, 1985
Pseudorhadinorhynchus pseudaspii Achmerov and Dombrovskaja-Achmerova, 1941
Pseudorhadinorhynchus samegaiensis Nakajima & Egusa, 1975
Pseudorhadinorhynchus srivastavai Gupta & Fatma, 1985
Pseudorhadinorhynchus vietnamensis Moravec and Sey, 1989
Tegorhynchus Van Cleve, 1921
Tegorhynchus africanus (Golvan, 1955)
Tegorhynchus brevis Van Cleave, 1921
Tegorhynchus cetratus (Van Cleave, 1945)
Tegorhynchus edmondsi (Golvan, 1960)
Tegorhynchus furcatus (Van Cleave & Lincicome, 1939)
Tegorhynchus holospinus Amin & Sey, 1996
Tegorhynchus multacanthus (Mamaev, 1970) Amin & Sey, 1996
Telosentis Van Cleve, 1923

Telosentis is a genus of acanthocephalans. The representatives of the genus are distributed in tropical waters of Indian ocean, Pacific coast of Australia and Mediterranean. Consists of four species:

Telosentis australiensis Edmonds, 1964
Telosentis exiguus (von Linstow, 1901)

T. exiguus is a widespread intestinal parasitic worm.  Its hosts are marine and brackish water fish of the Mediterranean basin. This species is found in the Mediterranean Sea (near the coasts of France and Italy), in the Adriatic Sea (Italy, Montenegro), the Sea of Marmara, the Black Sea and the Sea of Azov (near the coasts of Ukraine). T. exiguus is able to thrive in a variety hosts. It has been found as an intestinal parasite in anchovies, sand-smelts, shads, garfishes, eels, sticklebacks, pipe-fishes, grass gobies, some other gobies, blennies, and wrasses.

T. exiguus tegument is covered with spines in anterior and posterior parts. Its cerebral ganglion located in central part of the proboscis sac, sometime moved to anterior region. Its proboscis is cylindrical or club-shaped, armed with 12 longitudal rows of hooks of same type; the smaller hooks are in the posterior region of proboscis, larger is in its central part. The roots of the hooks have long forward-facing  appendixes.

In the Black Sea the intermediate hosts of this acanthocephalan is the amphipod Apherusa bispinosa, in the coelom of which the cystacanthes are located. Fish are infested by feeding on amphipods infected with larvae.Telosentis lutianusi Gupta & Gupta, 1990Telosentis mizellei Gupta & Fatma, 1988Telosentis molini''''' Van Cleave, 1923

Hosts

Notes

References

 
Echinorhynchida
Acanthocephala families